is a Prefectural Natural Park in Naruto, Tokushima Prefecture, Japan. Established in 1967, the park encompasses  and Ōasahiko Shrine.

See also
 National Parks of Japan

References

Parks and gardens in Tokushima Prefecture
Protected areas established in 1967
1967 establishments in Japan
Naruto, Tokushima